Berwick is a census-designated place (CDP) in the town of Berwick in York County, Maine, United States. The population was 2,187 at the 2010 census, out of a total of 7,246 in the entire town. It is part of the Portland–South Portland–Biddeford, Maine Metropolitan Statistical Area.

Geography
Berwick is located at  (43.267359, −70.861803).

Demographics

As of the census of 2000, there were 1,993 people, 776 households, and 506 families residing in the CDP. The racial makeup of the CDP was 96.24% White, 0.85% Black or African American, 0.25% Native American, 1.10% Asian, 0.05% Pacific Islander, 0.10% from other races, and 1.40% from two or more races. Hispanic or Latino of any race were 0.75% of the population.

There were 776 households, out of which 36.9% had children under the age of 18 living with them, 43.4% were married couples living together, 17.5% had a female householder with no husband present, and 34.7% were non-families. 27.1% of all households were made up of individuals, and 9.4% had someone living alone who was 65 years of age or older. The average household size was 2.52 and the average family size was 3.05.

In the CDP, the population was spread out, with 28.3% under the age of 18, 8.8% from 18 to 24, 32.4% from 25 to 44, 19.0% from 45 to 64, and 11.5% who were 65 years of age or older. The median age was 34 years. For every 100 females, there were 91.1 males. For every 100 females age 18 and over, there were 87.0 males.

The median income for a household in the CDP was $30,294, and the median income for a family was $41,985. Males had a median income of $38,050 versus $23,450 for females. The per capita income for the CDP was $16,822. About 17.4% of families and 17.5% of the population were below the poverty line, including 23.2% of those under age 18 and 16.9% of those age 65 or over.

Early history 
Ambrose Gibbens was the first white settler in Berwick around 1630. He made a settlement and established a trading post at Newichawannok (Old Berwick) near Quampeagan Falls, the head of navigation on the Piscataqua.  The region hosted a lot of pine trees and was one of the attractions to early settlers. As such, the first sawmill in America—called Gibbens' Sawmill—was set up at Newichawannok on the Great Works River.  That one sawmill quickly grew to 18 and the Native Americans called it "the place of great works".

It wasn't long before the area had grown into a bustling community of more than 200 people. By 1647 the settlements at Kittery had become the first town in Maine. Old Kittery included what is now Eliot, South Berwick, and Berwick.  Newichawannok (Old Berwick)  became the parish of Unity and was also called Kittery Commons, and Kittery, North Parish. Over time, townspeople ceased using the name Unity and began to refer to this area as "Barwick".

References

Census-designated places in Maine
Portland metropolitan area, Maine
Census-designated places in York County, Maine
1630 establishments in the Thirteen Colonies